Hidden Hills is an American sitcom television series that aired on NBC from September 24, 2002 to January 21, 2003, during the 2002 fall line up. Based on the book Surviving Suburbia, the series was created by Peter Segal and Ric Swartzlander.  The theme song was "Pleasant Valley Sunday", made famous by The Monkees. Mark Mothersbaugh (co-founder of Devo) performed the version used on the show. The show was made by Ric Swartzlander's Rude Mood Productions and NBC.

Cast

Main
 Justin Louis as Doug Barber
 Paula Marshall as Dr. Janine Barber
 Kristin Bauer as Belinda Slypich
 Stacy Galina as Pam Asher
 Tamara Taylor as Sarah Timmerman
 Dondré Whitfield as Zack Timmerman
 Alexa Nikolas as Emily Barber
 Sean Marquette as Derek Barber

Recurring
 Cristián de la Fuente as Manolo
 Sandra McCoy as Miss Lily

Episodes

External links
 
 

2000s American sitcoms
2002 American television series debuts
2003 American television series endings
English-language television shows
Single-camera television sitcoms
NBC original programming
Television series by Universal Television
Television shows based on American novels
Television shows set in California